Elise Flagg (born 1951) is an American ballet dancer who worked with George Balanchine as a dancer at the New York City Ballet .

Life
Elise Flagg was born December 23, 1951 in Detroit, Michigan. Her sister Laura is also a dancer.

In the 1960s and 1960s Flagg danced with the New York City Ballet. She was featured in George Balanchine's Western Symphony, Ivesiana and A Midsummer Night's Dream. She also performed in Richard Tanner's Octuor. After Gelsey Kirkland suffered injury, Flagg danced the Nightingale in Kirkland's place in John Taras' production of Song of the Nightingale at the 1972 Stravinsky Festival. After Kirkland recovered from her injury, Flagg resumed the role of the Mechanical Nightingale opposite her.

Flagg runs a dance academy, the Elise Flagg Academy of Dance. In 2020 the academy moved from West Chicago to a new studio in Geneva, Illinois.

References

1951 births
Living people
People from Detroit
20th-century American ballet dancers
American ballerinas